{{DISPLAYTITLE:C9H16}}
The molecular formula C9H16 (molar mass: 124.22 g/mol, exact mass: 124.1252 u) may refer to:

 Cyclononene
 Nonyne